Anisotome procumbens, the mountain celery, is a small, perennial herb endemic to the Australian State of Tasmania. It is primarily found in high-elevation habitats in the west and south-west of the island.

Taxonomy
Anisotome procumbens was first described as Gingidium procumbens by Ferdinand von Mueller from plants collected at Mount La Perouse, Tasmania by A. Oldfield.

Description
Anisotome procumbens is a mat- or cushion-forming perennial herb with glossy, bright green, deeply divided leaves in a basal rosette and an umbellate inflorescence typical of the family. Some of the dolerite mountaintops of south-eastern Tasmania, such as Adamsons Peak and Hartz Peak have healthy populations of A. procumbens. At these locations, individual mats can reach over 2 m in diameter.

References

External links
 Key to Tasmanian Vascular Plants: Anisotome procumbens

Flora of Tasmania
Apioideae